Stompin 76 Music Festival was known as "the Woodstock of Bluegrass". The 3 day camp-out music took place Friday through Sunday, August 6, 7 and 8 in 1976, eight miles north of Galax, VA at the New River Jam Site owned by the Lawson family. Not associated with the performer Doyle Lawson. 1976 was the year of the US Bicentennial and young people were looking for a party. That summer the big concert tour staged in large arenas and stadiums was Elton John and Dave Mason. Stompin 76 was promoted at these concerts from Boston to Miami.

History
Over 100,000 attended Stompin' 76; including many who were clogged on Carroll County, VA area roads. Others parked on the interstate and walked up to 11 miles to reach the epic event from Interstate 77. This one great music festival would come to be known as "The Woodstock Of Bluegrass".

For three days in the summer of the American Bicentennial, 90 miles west of Roanoke, Virginia, just a stone's throw from the North Carolina border, bluegrass and blues abounded. Outdoor music festival lovers from all parts of the eastern US gathered for that historic weekend. Helicopters and motorcycles were used to get performers and supplies in and out of the rural site located next to the New River in Southwest Virginia.

Appearing on one stage: Bonnie Raitt, Earl Scruggs, Lester Flatt & Nashville Grass, Vassar Clements, Ry Cooder, John Hartford, Osborne Brothers, The Rowans, John Prine, Nitty Gritty Dirt Band, Doc & Merle Watson, The Dillards, Hickory Wind, New Grass Revival, Red, White and Bluegrass, Nashville Bluegrass Band, Papa John Creach, David Bromberg, Star Spangled Washboard Band, Eric Weissberg and Deliverance, Grass On The Rocks, Good Ol' Boys, Joe and Bing.

Three days of fun and music, all for only $12.00 advance/ $15.00 at the gate! As a result of the disturbance the event created in this rural community, the county instituted laws to control outdoor music festivals. The popularity of Stompin 76 is a contributing factor to the growth of the Galax Fiddler's Convention in the late 1970s.

Promoter Hal Davidson, a Maryland native, was a mere 20 years old at the time. He established a concert company in Las Vegas the year before, Cactus Productions, Inc., which was the name of the company behind Stompin 76. Hal conceived the idea for a large music festival in mid-February 1976 at his roommate's Reisterstown, MD apartment. Davidson had tired of promoting small venue concerts such as Thin Lizzy, Golden Earring, Spirit, Niles Lofgren, Leslie West, Natalie Cole, Chick Corea and a slew of now classic concerts, in 1975 at U of Maryland Baltimore County, Painter's Mill Music Fair and the Lyric Theater in Baltimore.

In 2010 Davidson said the 2,500-4,000 seat venues multiplied times the anemic $5.50-$7.50 going ticket price at the time, made those concerts fun but not necessarily profitable. He felt a major rock festival was needed. When he found out the cost of major rock acts, he decided on bluegrass with a touch of blues. It would be 3 days, there would be camping and 22 great bands. Stompin 76 was born.

With a Baltimore staff about his same age, Hal Davidson rented a Beechcraft Baron 6 seat airplane, an ex-Vietnam pilot and started promoted the event intensely throughout 20 states March 1, 1976. The huge attendance is attributed to the massive marketing, great line-up and a special summer, being the bicentennial year.

An unrelenting 21-week marketing campaign included dozens of eastern US radio stations, Rolling Stone/ Village Voice ads, newspaper ads, articles, aerial banners over major beaches and pervasive flyer/ poster campaigns at concerts made this was one of the original organized festival street teams. The posters said "Super Sound in Our Natural Amphitheater and Free Camping and Parking On Hundreds of Wooded Acres". Tens of thousands of red, white and blue long lasting vinyl bumper stickers were distributed through street teams and mailed back with each ticket order. The great majority of 30,000 or so tickets sold were purchased through mail order. Ticketron, the predecessor of TicketMaster was not in operation until July, 1976, though tickets were available at approx. 25 ticket outlets including Kemp Mill Records in MD, National Record Mart in PA, WV and VA, Strawberry's in Boston and Globe Records in OH and many independent records stores in NC, VA and MD.
The great majority of attendees entered for free. Hal Davidson blames CES, the Baltimore based security company which said to him at the event they wanted an additional $30,000 to secure the perimeter that they "were not hired to do that". The promoter told them the damage was already done and he wasn't paying them any more than he had. Appalled and stunned, he never spoke to them again.

In 1998 an attendee from New Castle, VA named Pete said: "The strongest memories are the musical ones. Bonnie Raitt doing a searing 'Love Me Like A Man'. The Dillards doing a gospel number, their acapella voices drifting through the Virginia countryside. These memories will stay in my soul forever."

In 2006, writing into the Stompin76 web site, Turtle said: "15 yrs old at the time. Traveled down from PA in a four vehicle caravan. Couldn't get any closer than a few miles from the music. Hiked to the music, when I came back my people moved camp. Didn't see them for 3 days. Run ins with Pagans bikers, Moonshine vendors, young ladies of questionable morals and flash floods. What a BIG time for a teenager."

Hal Davidson is now a concert and festival consultant residing in Maryland. He has planned and produces major festivals for clients in many states and in Australia, Cyprus and Canada. 2006 was the 30th anniversary of this event. Davidson has also authored comprehensive promoting manuals available on his websites. His main websites are concert-promotions.com, rentapromoter.com. Hal stays in touch with Stompin fans and sells Stompin 76 tee shirts at the event's Official web site, <www.stompin76.com>. Many attendees and their decedents still talk about wild experiences and forging close relationships lasting a lifetime at the web site. "Bluegrass music did it!" said Davidson in 2010.

In 2013 there was discussion with members of the Hillsville, Virginia community about another Stompin, and though Hal said "it was unlikely a 40th Anniversary festival would take place in 2016", it looks like the town of Hillsville will get their bluegrass festival after all. Headlining for HillFest 2016" are The Church Sisters, Hackensaw Boys and Fake Flowers Real Dirt.

See also
List of bluegrass music festivals
List of old-time music festivals

References

External links
 
 Concert-promotions.com – Stompin 76 sticker
 Fake Flowers Real Dirt & Hackensaw Boys "LIVE" at HillFest 2016

Folk festivals in the United States
Music festivals in Virginia
1976 in Virginia
Bluegrass festivals
Music festivals established in 1976
Tourist attractions in Carroll County, Virginia